Thomas Michael Greenhow MD MRCS  FRCS (5 July 1792 – 25 October 1881) was an English surgeon and epidemiologist.

Career

Greenhow was the second son of Edward Martin Greenhow, an army surgeon of North Shields, Tynemouth. He was a medical graduate of the University of Edinburgh and  became  M.R.C.S. (London)  in 1814,  having  been  a surgery  student at  London's Guy's and St Thomas's Hospital.

Greenhow spent much of his working life in Newcastle. He and fellow surgeon Sir John Fife are recorded together in 1827 as being Eminent Persons of Newcastle and Gateshead.  Greenhow's  surgical inventions were heralded by London surgeons in the 1830s. Debretts  records that Greenhow  was   a  Fellow of the Royal College of Surgeons of England, having become, in  1843, one of the original 300 fellows.

Greenhow worked in all  areas of surgery and had a particular interest in obstetrics and gynaecology;  in 1845, he controversially published detailed accounts regarding  his views on the gynaecological status  of Harriet Martineau, who  was both his patient and  sister-in-law.

Greenhow was  a pioneer in the establishment of the University of Durham and in 1855  was a lecturer at the Newcastle-Upon-Tyne's medical  college, in connection with Durham University. He and Sir John Fife founded what would become the Newcastle University Medical School. The two men also founded Newcastle's Eye Infirmary. Greenhow worked as the senior  surgeon at the Newcastle Infirmary, later renamed the Royal Victoria Infirmary, for many years and was instrumental in its expansion in the 1850s. While working there, he trained John Snow. Greenhow and Snow both advocated for the usage of chloroform when performing  major surgery and undertook "dedicated research" to end the London cholera pandemic. Greenhow's son, surgeon Henry  Martineau Greenhow, reported  in The Lancet his father's surgical success involving chloroform.

Greenhow and his  nephew, physician Edward Headlam Greenhow, undertook much research into  medical hygiene and public health, publishing papers throughout the 1850s  warning of  further impending cholera pandemics. On 6 May 1856, Thomas Greenhow delivered a lecture on this topic at his alma mater, St Thomas' Hospital, where Snow was working as an anaesthetist. In October 1856, E.H.Greenhow became Lecturer on Public Health at  St  Thomas'.

Thomas Greenhow retired  to Leeds in 1860, dying there on 25 October 1881 at Newton Hall.

Family
Greenhow's first wife was Elizabeth Martineau 1794–1850, who succumbed to tuberculosis after producing four children. She was a daughter of Thomas Martineau and Elizabeth Rankin, of the prosperous, socially reformist Martineau family, mainly based in Birmingham. His wife's siblings included the religious philosopher James and the sociologist and political theorist Harriet.

Greenhow's first child and only daughter, Frances, was born in 1821. She married into the Lupton family of Leeds, wealthy wool manufacturers and Unitarians, a branch of English Dissenters. She worked to open up educational opportunities for women, and, more prominently, their access to universities. His first son and second child, Edward Meadows Greenhow, (1822–1840) died at the age of 18.

Greenhow's second son, Henry Martineau Greenhow (1829–1912), followed his father into medicine. He studied  at  University College, London, and by  1854 was  a  Member of the Royal College of Surgeons of England.  He joined the Indian Medical Service spending his entire career in British India, and rising to surgeon major.

Greenhow's third and youngest son, Judge William Thomas Greenhow (1831–1921)  received  his Bachelor of Laws at Somerset House at  King's  College, London in 1853.

In 1854 at Leeds Mill Hill Chapel, Greenhow married his second wife, Anne (1812–1905), daughter of William Lupton, the father-in-law of Greenhow's  daughter Frances Lupton.

References

Further reading 
 http://www.wargs.com/other/middleton.html
  Northumberland & Durham Family History Society Journal  - Summer 2019 Volume 44, Number 2, pages 82–85, Author - REED, Michael -  "We Are Amused: How  a breakthrough in medical research by the Duchess of  Cambridge's Newcastle ancestors was personally  appreciated by Queen  Victoria"

1792 births
1881 deaths
Scientists from Newcastle upon Tyne
19th-century English medical doctors
Fellows of the Royal College of Surgeons